Cadwallader Humphrey was a member of the Wisconsin State Assembly during the 1861 session. Humphrey was a native of Cascade, Wisconsin. He was a Democrat.

References

External links
The Political Graveyard

People from Sheboygan County, Wisconsin
Year of birth missing
Year of death missing
Democratic Party members of the Wisconsin State Assembly